The Flight of Dragons is a 1982 animated fantasy film produced and directed by Jules Bass and Arthur Rankin Jr. loosely combining the speculative natural history book of the same name (1979) by Peter Dickinson with the novel The Dragon and the George (1976) by Gordon R. Dickson. It stars the voices of John Ritter, Victor Buono, James Gregory, James Earl Jones, and Harry Morgan. The film centers upon a quest undertaken to stop an evil wizard who plans to rule the world by dark magic. A major theme within the story is the question of whether science and magic can co-exist. This is told mostly through the experience of character Peter Dickinson, drawn from the 20th century into the magical realm.

Released direct to video in United Kingdom on August 17, 1982, it was aired as an ABC "Saturday Night Movie" on August 2, 1986, and released by Warner Brothers as a made-to-order DVD in the US on 17 November 2009 as part of the "Warner Archive Collection".

The opening song is sung by Don McLean.

Plot 
In an age of medieval fantasy populated by fantastic creatures, the Green Wizard  Carolinus, who presides over nature, notices that magic is fading from the world as humanity embraces logic and science instead. Summoning his three magical brothers, he proposes combining their powers to create a "last realm of magic" hidden from the rest of the world. The Blue Wizard Solarius, who commands the heavens  and seas, and the Golden Wizard Lo Tae Zhao, whose realm is light and air, agree to the proposal. However, the Red Wizard Ommadon, master of black magic and the forces of evil, resolves instead to infect mankind with fear and greed, causing humans to use their science to destroy themselves.

Since the wizards are forbidden to fight among themselves, Carolinus proposes sending a group of heroes on a quest to steal Ommadon's crown, which is the source of his power. The party includes the knight Sir Orrin Neville-Smythe and Carolinus' young dragon companion Gorbash. Solarius gives them an enchanted shield which can deflect dark magic, and Lo Tae Zhao contributes a magic flute which lulls dragons to sleep. Requiring a leader, Carolinus consults the magical force of Antiquity, which directs him to look 1,000 years into the future to find a man of science descended from a legendary hero. In late 20th century Boston Carolinus locates Peter Dickinson, a former scientist turned board game designer who is obsessed with dragons. Carolinus brings Peter back through time and enlists him in the quest, and Peter becomes enamored of Carolinus' ward, Princess Melisande. Ommadon sends his dragon Bryagh to capture Peter, and an accident with one of Carolinus' spells while rescuing him causes Peter to merge with Gorbash, Peter's mind taking over the dragon's body.

Knowing nothing about being a dragon, Peter is mentored by Carolinus' elder dragon companion, Smrgol. The dichotomy of magic and science is explored when Smrgol teaches Peter how dragons fly and breathe fire, abilities which Peter is able to explain with scientific principles. As the quest progresses, the heroes survive an attack by the monstrous Sand Murks and are joined by the talking wolf Aragh, the archer Danielle, and the elf Giles. As the party nears Ommadon's realm, Danielle and Sir Orrin are captured by an ogre. Peter is nearly killed attempting to rescue them but is saved by Smrgol, who defeats the ogre at the cost of his own life. In the Red Wizard's realm the party faces the Worm of Sligoff, which Peter destroys by igniting the sulfuric acid it excretes. Ommadon casts a spell to induce hopelessness in the group, which Peter repels using Solarius' shield. Ommadon next sends numerous dragons to kill the heroes, but Giles plays Lo Tae Zhao's enchanted flute, lulling them and Peter to sleep. Bryagh remains awake and kills Giles, Aragh, and Danielle. Sir Orrin slays Bryagh, but dies from his wounds.

When Ommadon appears on the battlefield, Peter manages to separate himself from Gorbash by recalling the principle of impenetrability. He is able to defeat Ommadon by countering the wizard's declarations of magic with explanations of science and logic, and denying the existence of magic. This destroys Ommadon, restores the other heroes to life, and allows the magical realm to take shape. Peter, having denied all magic, is separated forever from this realm, but not before awakening Melisande with a kiss and leaving her Ommadon's crown. Having fallen in love with Peter, Melisande begs Carolinus to allow her to join him. Back in 20th century Boston, Peter is selling the magic flute and shield to a pawnbroker when Melisande enters the shop carrying the crown, and the two embrace.

Voice cast 
 Victor Buono as Aragh
 James Gregory as Smrgol and Bryagh
 James Earl Jones as Ommadon
 Harry Morgan as Carolinus
 John Ritter as Peter Dickinson
 Larry Storch as the pawnbroker
 Don Messick as Lo Tae Zhao, Giles the Elf
 Bob McFadden as Gorbash and Sir Orrin Neville-Smythe
 Alexandra Stoddart as the Princess Melisande
 Nellie Bellflower as Danielle
 Paul Frees as Solarius the Blue Wizard, Antiquity (uncredited)

Additional character voices were provided by Ed Peck and Jack Lester.

Crew

Reception 
Filmsy.com said of the film, "Animated fantasy films geared for family viewing just aren’t made like this anymore... The voice acting in this movie is excellent, to say the least... Though the animation might seem a bit 'dated', it remains beautiful by 1982 standards". "The dialogue is surprisingly intelligent and may confuse some children but it is nice to see an animated film that will stimulate adult minds a little... The voice cast are all great and I can’t find a single fault with any of them", said blogcritic.org. The Unknown Movies said "There may not be a strong constant thread in The Flight of Dragons, but all its moments of warmth, imagination, and interest combine to make magic."

Colin Greenland reviewed The Flight of Dragons for Imagine magazine, and stated that "The Flight of Dragons is unsophisticated to say the least, but the Japanese animation includes some nice shimmering effects; and if, like Dickinson's, your best character is a dragon, then this is for you."

Other reviews were less positive: "I'm sure fans of The Flight of Dragons, sick of looking at crappy downloads or worn VHS copies, will be satisfied with what's here, but if you didn't grow up with this one, it's best left alone."

Distribution 
Various VHS editions of the film have been released since its debut in 1982. There was also a LaserDisc release from which some VHS copies were produced. The LaserDisc release was made by PolyGram Video in the United Kingdom, and there was also a Betamax release. In 1996, Warner Home Video released the film as part of the Warner Bros. Classic Tales VHS series, which is also available in Australia one year later. The Warner Archive Collection released the film on DVD on November 17, 2009. In December 2017, Warner Archive announced that they would be releasing the film on Blu-ray in 2018.

Soundtrack 
The original score was composed by Maury Laws. The film's theme song, also entitled "The Flight of Dragons", was written and composed by Jules Bass and Maury Laws, and performed by Don McLean. An official soundtrack was never released. However, Disney multi Emmy Award-winning film and television composer Carl Johnson did recreate several tracks from the animation for the live-action adaptation. Though the film was put on hiatus, 3 of the completed tracks were released online.

See also 
 List of animated feature films of 1982

References

External links 

 
 The Wonderful World of Rankin-Bass
 The Flight of Dragons Live Action Movie; 2014

1982 animated films
1982 films
1982 direct-to-video films
1980s American animated films
1980s fantasy adventure films
Ogres in animated film
American animated fantasy films
American fantasy adventure films
Animated films based on novels
Animated films about dragons
Films about wizards
Films based on American novels
Films based on fantasy novels
Films based on multiple works
Films directed by Jules Bass
Films directed by Arthur Rankin Jr.
Films directed by Katsuhisa Yamada
Films scored by Maury Laws
Japanese animated fantasy films
Japanese fantasy adventure films
Rankin/Bass Productions films
American sword and sorcery films
Topcraft
Films with screenplays by Romeo Muller
1980s children's animated films
1980s English-language films